is a town located in Miyagi Prefecture, Japan. , the town had an estimated population of 8,637 and a population density of 32 persons per km2 in 3,391 households.

Geography
Kawasaki is located in south-western Miyagi Prefecture, bordered by the Ōu Mountains to the west. Mount Zaō (1840.8 meters) is partly within the borders of Kawasaki. About 85% of the town area is classified as mountainous.

Neighboring municipalities
Miyagi Prefecture
Sendai
Murata
Zaō
Yamagata Prefecture
Yamagata
Kaminoyama

Climate
Kawasaki has a humid climate (Köppen climate classification Cfa) characterized by mild summers and cold winters.  The average annual temperature in Kawasaki is 11.0 °C. The average annual rainfall is 1318 mm with September as the wettest month. The temperatures are highest on average in August, at around 24.1 °C, and lowest in January, at around -0.9 °C.

Demographics
Per Japanese census data, the population of Kawasaki has declined over the past 70 years.

History
The area of present-day Kawasaki was part of ancient Mutsu Province, and was part of the holdings of Sendai Domain under the Edo period Tokugawa shogunate. The village of Kawasaki was established on April 1, 1889 with the establishment of post-Meiji restoration modern municipalities system. It was promoted to town status on May 3, 1948. Kawasaki merged with the neighboring town of Tomioka and the former village of Hasekura on April 20, 1955.

Government
Kawasaki has a mayor-council form of government with a directly elected mayor and a unicameral city legislature of 13 members. Kawasaki, collectively with the other municipalities in Shibata District contributes two seats to the Miyagi Prefectural legislature. In terms of national politics, the town is part of Miyagi 3rd district of the lower house of the Diet of Japan.

Economy
The economy of Kawasaki is largely based on agriculture and forestry.

Education
 Kawasaki has four public elementary schools and two public middle schools operated by the town government, one public high school operated by the Miyagi Prefectural Board of Education.

Transportation

Railway
Kawasaki is not served by any passenger train lines.

Highway
: Miyagi-Kawasaki and Sasaya IC

Local attractions
Kamafusa Dam
Site of Kawasaki Castle

References

External links

Official Website 

 
Towns in Miyagi Prefecture